Oscar Massin (1829–1913) was a Belgian-born French jeweler known as “The Diamond Reformer," who created some of the 19th centuries most influential and innovative fine jewelry that radically redefined a new era for the industry at large. While Massin remains one of the least-known Parisian jewelers, he produced some of the most significant works of his time, many for European royalty. Massin is celebrated for his patented diamond lacework technique, which uses filigree to create the illusion of woven metal. Massin is also credited with creating the first “illusory” setting, designed to emphasize the size of the diamond by minimizing the metal around it.

Early life

Born in Liège, Belgium in 1829, Oscar Massin was trained as a jeweler from the age of 11 and educated at the Academy of Fine Arts. In 1851, he moved to Paris, then in a golden age of haute joaillerie, where Théodore Fester took him on as a bench jeweler for the next three years. To supplement his income, Massin also sketched his own jewelry designs, which caught the attention of goldsmith Léon Rouvenat, who hired Massin as his Chef d’Atelier. Massin went on to work for Viette—a renowned workshop of manufacturing jewelers—who had been commissioned to design a tiara for Empress Eugènie of France. He continued to create bespoke pieces for royalty around the world.

Massin was as much a teacher as an artist, generously opening the door for his students and all those who followed, by sharing his original techniques and purposeful design approach. Massin considered progress a more noble cause than personal gain, never using his patents against copyists; he exhibited unfinished or deconstructed jewels solely for teaching purposes. And, in response to low payment in the trade, he set a new precedent for better living standards for all craftsmen, exhibiting his remarkable generosity of time, ideas, and support for both his community and a new generation of future artists and designers.

Career

Oscar Massin was a master draftsman and innovative designer, deeply committed to the integrity and elevation of his craft. He took pride in his capacity to work a piece of jewelry from its initial design through completion. He studied the structure and engineering of diamond settings in the service of naturalism—resulting in extraordinary pieces that celebrate light and organic growth.

In the early-to-mid 1860s, Massin began to explore new, naturalistic models featuring floral and foliate motifs with delicate, nearly invisible mounting; Massin dedicated significant time to the study of flowers, botanicals and even insects within their natural worlds in order to fully understand the intricacies of their composition, resulting in original, imaginative design.

Before opening up his own jewelry studio in 1863, Massin worked as a designer and goldsmith for many well known jewelers in Paris, including the famous Lemonnier. In 1867, Massin exhibited at the International Exposition of 1867 for the first time under his own name. His centerpiece: a tiara designed with a diamond, ruby and emerald bandeau finished with a diamond-set feather and gem-set chains.

He continued to exhibit, and at the Exposition Universelle (1878), was awarded both a Grand Prix and the Legion of Honour. Among his exquisite creations: a three-dimensional rose pavé-set with diamonds, as well as a diamond-set belt and a tiara pairing with diamond briolettes.

For more than two decades Massin continued to design and create for the most important jewelers of his time, including Baugrand, Fontana, Sandoz and Rouvenat, Boucheron, Mellerio, Chaumet, and Tiffany. Massin retired in 1891, leaving behind a legacy of innovation and carving a path forward for those who followed.

Massin died in his Parisian apartment on February, 13th 1913.

Works and commissions
1860:
 Tiara with brooch—wild roses, wheat and oats, sold to Georgian Princess Catherina Dadiani; beginning of Massin’s exploration of naturalism.

1863:
 Eglantine branch, one of Massin’s most influential and replicated designs.

1867: 
 The first time Massin exhibited under his own name at the Exposition Universelle with his Grand parure de tête and Diadème arceaux.

1878:   
 Diamond tea rose brooch
 Diamond necklace, designed as a series of clusters, each set with a cushion-shaped diamond within a double border of rose diamonds, spaced by claw-set cushion-shaped diamonds and suspending a similar drop-shaped pendant.
 Patented diamond lace, offered by the meter.

1879:
 Medallion for King William III of the Netherlands, set with a rare portrait diamond engraved with a profile of the King’s head. The King presented the piece to his bride, Princess Emma.
 Diamond belt for Nizam family

1889:
 Diamond and silver tiara for Princess Louise of Wales

References

1829 births
1913 deaths
Belgian jewellers
Belgian jewellery designers
French jewellers
French jewellery designers
Grand Croix of the Légion d'honneur

19th-century Belgian artists
19th-century Belgian male artists
Artists from Liège
Belgian emigrants to France
19th-century French artists